Harry Callahan may refer to:

 Harry Callahan (photographer) (1912–1999), American photographer
 Harry Callahan (character) or Dirty Harry, as fictional police detective portrayed by Clint Eastwood

See also
 Henry Callahan (1957–1982), American sportsman